The Polish Basketball Supercup (Polish: "Superpuchar Polski w Koszykówce") is the supercup game of Polish men's top-tier level professional club basketball. Each season, the winner of the Polish League, plays against the winner of the Polish Cup, to cap off the new season. The first Polish Supercup game was played on September 4, 1999, and it was won by Śląsk Wrocław.

Matches

Titles by team
Teams in italics are no longer active.

See also
Polish League
Polish Cup

Notes

External links
Polska Liga Koszykówki - Official Site 
Polish League at Eurobasket.com

Basketball supercup competitions in Europe
Basketball competitions in Poland